Thomas Fairhall (25 November 1901 — death unknown) born in Raymond Terrace, Newcastle, New South Wales was an Australian professional bantam/feather/light/welter/middleweight boxer of the 1910s, '20s and '30s who won the Australian lightweight title, Australian welterweight title, and British Empire lightweight title, his professional fighting weight varied from , i.e. bantamweight to , i.e. middleweight.

Professional boxing record

References

External links

1901 births
Bantamweight boxers
Year of death missing
Featherweight boxers
Lightweight boxers
Middleweight boxers
People from Newcastle, New South Wales
Sportspeople from Newcastle, New South Wales
Welterweight boxers
Australian male boxers
Commonwealth Boxing Council champions